The Animals Act 1971 is an Act of the Parliament of the United Kingdom (c 22) the purpose of which was to codify civil liability for damage done by animals in England and Wales.

Section 1 broadly provides for the abolition of common law torts relating to cattle trespass and to the old common law scienter action with respect to animals which are ferae naturae or otherwise known to be vicious, as well as the abrogation of statutory provisions relating to civil liability in the Dogs Act 1906.

The provisions largely codify the pre-existing common law rules.

Case law

In that case Lord Nicholls of Birkenhead commented, "Unfortunately the language of section 2(2) is ... opaque. In this instance the parliamentary draftsman's zeal for brevity has led to obscurity. Over the years section 2(2) has attracted much judicial obloquy."

References
Halsbury's Statutes

United Kingdom Acts of Parliament 1971
Acts of the Parliament of the United Kingdom concerning England and Wales